Salhewara is main village of area in Khairagarh  district of Indian state Chhattisgarh. The population of the villages is about 5000.

Geography
The village is situated in the middle of a forest and is very near to the border of Madhya Pradesh. It has good transportation facility to the major cities of Chhattisgarh which are Raipur (Capital of State), Durg and Rajnandgaon.

Facilities
It has the basic amenities such as Higher Secondary School, 24 hr electricity, Panchayat and has a status of block. It has 3 banks.

References

Villages in Rajnandgaon district